Rainer Hasler (2 July 1958 – c. 29 October 2014) was a Liechtenstein footballer who played as a defender. In November 2003, to celebrate UEFA's jubilee, he was selected by the Liechtenstein Football Association as the country's Golden Player, the greatest player of the last 50 years.

Club career
Hasler played as a right back for Grasshopper Club Zürich, FC Vaduz, Neuchâtel Xamax and Servette FC. For Servette, he spent two years as captain, where he won the 1984–85 Swiss championship and the Swiss Cup. Another major success was with Xamax reaching the UEFA Cup quarter-final in the 1981–82 season.

He retired from football in 1989 at 31 years of age.

International career
Hasler never played for Liechtenstein, as the national team barely participated in any games before he retired.

Death
Hasler died c. 29 October 2014 at the age of 56.

References

External links
Liechtenstein's Hasler scaled Swiss peaks

UEFA Golden Players
Liechtenstein footballers
1958 births
2014 deaths
Grasshopper Club Zürich players
FC Vaduz players
Servette FC players
Neuchâtel Xamax FCS players
Swiss Super League players
People from Vaduz
Association football defenders